Vlad Marian Tudorache (born 16 February 1995) is a Romanian professional footballer who plays as a midfielder for Liga II side Ripensia Timișoara. Tudorache made his debut at senior level for Jiul Petroșani at only 17 years old, then he played for Universitatea Petroșani and second teams of Dinamo București and FC Voluntari until he transferred to Afumați in the summer of 2016.

His father, Marin Tudorache, is also a former footballer and currently a manager.

References

External links
 

1995 births
Living people
People from Petroșani
Romanian footballers
Association football midfielders
Romania youth international footballers
CSM Jiul Petroșani players
Liga II players
CS Afumați players
ACS Viitorul Târgu Jiu players
FC Ripensia Timișoara players